Frump may refer to:

 "Mr. Frump in the Iron Lung", a song on the album "Weird Al" Yankovic
 The surname of some of the characters in The Addams Family (1964 TV series)
 Donald Frump, an elephant character in Rocko's Modern Life
 Judge Horatio Curmudgeon Frump, a character in Tumbleweeds (comic strip)
 Babe Frump, NFL player